Aerotec S/A Indústria Aeronáutica was a Brazilian aircraft manufacturer founded in 1962 with the support of the Department of Science and Aerospace Technology (Portuguese: Departamento de Ciência e Tecnologia Aeroespacial; DCTA) in São José dos Campos.

History
Beginning in the late 1960s, the company produced a two-seat trainer aircraft for the Brazilian Air Force, the Aerotec A.122 Uirapuru. Thirty units were produced for the civilian market. The Uirapuru was also exported to Bolivia and Paraguay.

Thereafter, Aerotec produced mainly components for Embraer until 1980. At that time, the Brazilian Air Force showed interest in a performance-enhanced version of the Uirapuru. A prototype with an improved cockpit canopy and enlarged tail unit was built as the A.132 Uirapuru II. Since the Brazilian Air Force did not order this aircraft, only a few examples were produced for Bolivia.

In 1987, the company was acquired by Embraer.

Aircraft

See also
 Companhia Aeronáutica Paulista
 Indústria Aeronáutica Neiva

References

Notes

Bibliography

 
 

Embraer
Defunct aircraft manufacturers of Brazil
Companies based in São Paulo (state)
Brazilian brands